Naeim Sadavi Saad (born June 16, 1969 in Ahvaz) is a retired Iranian football player, who was banned from playing for a year for doping, and now a football coach.

Playing career

Club career
He played for a few clubs in Iran, namely Bahman, Persepolis FC and Foolad FC.

Doping ban
Sadavi tested positive for banned substances and was banned for playing for a year for doping,

International career
He participated at 1998 FIFA World Cup for the Iran national football team.

International goals
Scores and results list Iran's goal tally first.

Managerial career
He coached Sanat Naft FC and has coached Shahin Bushehr in Iran's Azadegan League from 2005 after Human Afazeli's departure from the club.  On 25 May 2016, he was appointed as head coach of Foolad with signing a three-year contract with the club.

Statistics

References

Iranian footballers
Iran international footballers
Association football defenders
Persepolis F.C. players
1996 AFC Asian Cup players
1998 FIFA World Cup players
Foolad FC players
Iranian football managers
1969 births
Living people
Persepolis F.C. non-playing staff
Iranian sportspeople in doping cases
Iranian Arab sportspeople
Bahman players
People from Ahvaz
Sportspeople from Khuzestan province
Persian Gulf Pro League managers
Shahin Bushehr F.C. managers